This is a list of the Australian moth species of the family Erebidae. It also acts as an index to the species articles and forms part of the full List of moths of Australia.

Speiredonia darwiniana Zilli, 2010
Speiredonia mutabilis Fabricius, 1794
Speiredonia obscura Cramer, 1780
Speiredonia spectans Guenée, 1852

Australia
Erebidae